The Dutch–Hanseatic War was a conflict between the Burgundian Netherlands and the Hanseatic League over the latter's control of Baltic shipping. It began in 1438 and ended with the 1441 Treaty of Copenhagen, which authorized unlimited Dutch access to the Baltic grain trade.

On 7 April 1438, Philip the Good, Duke of Burgundy allowed Dutch privateering against the six Wendish cities of the League—Hamburg, Lübeck, Lüneburg, Greifswald, Stettin (now Szczecin) and Anklam—and the Duchy of Holstein. On 23 April, the Hanseatic League informed its member cities of a possible war with Holland and advised shipping via Flanders, rather than Holland or Zeeland.

References 

Wars involving the Hanseatic League
Wars involving the Netherlands